Abeso is a surname. Notable people with the surname include:

Celesdonio Abeso (born 1998), Equatoguinean footballer 
Natalia Abeso (born 1986), Equatoguinean footballer